"Cocoa Butter Kisses" is a song by American rapper Chance the Rapper from his second mixtape Acid Rap (2013). The song features American rappers Vic Mensa and Twista, and was produced by Cam O'bi and Peter Cottontale. It is one of Chance the Rapper's most popular songs to date.

Background
At the time when the song was written, Vic Mensa was staying at an apartment in Humboldt Park, Chicago with his manager Cody Kazarian. Chance the Rapper visited one day and showed Mensa a verse and hook he had written earlier. Soon, Mensa began composing his part for the song. In an interview with DJ Booth, Cam O'bi stated that both Chance and Mensa wrote the song while "on mushrooms".

The song was originally recorded on a different instrumental and titled "Babies and Gunshots: Fuck Hawaii Pt. 2" (which, according to Mensa, was because "we were ruminating on the effects of violence in our community"). The original producer had already given the beat to another rapper and did not let Chance to use it, so Mensa put Cam O'bi in touch with Peter Cottonwood. The rappers asked the producers to remake the beat. In a jam session, Chance and Mensa repeatedly sang the hook while O'bi provided the drums on FL Studio and Cottonwood played chords on the keyboard. Once the producers had a chord progression and bassline ready, Mensa (as a member of Kids These Days) and Chance had to go on tour together for about a week. Upon Chance's request, O'bi finished production by the time they came back.

Chance the Rapper already had an idea of bringing Twista on the track as well. A few weeks after Chance and Mensa finished their verses, Twista recorded a third verse for the song. According to Twista, the song reminded him of being young, as well as memories of smoking marijuana when he became an adult.

Composition 
Fred Thomas, in an AllMusic review of Acid Rap, wrote that the song "folds church organ swells and synthesizer swirls into its huge, straightforward beat". Lyrically, the song centers on how the rappers' lifestyles of smoking and drugs has caused them to be apart from their families due to their disapproval. In his verse, Chance the Rapper sings about missing the memories of his childhood, such as Nickelodeon's VHS tapes and Chuck E. Cheese pizza.

Covers
In October 2013, English singer Dua Lipa released a cover of the song.

References

2013 songs
Chance the Rapper songs
Vic Mensa songs
Twista songs
Songs written by Chance the Rapper
Songs written by Twista
Songs about drugs
Songs about nostalgia